Emerson House may refer to:

Ralph Waldo Emerson House, Concord, Massachusetts, listed on the NRHP in Massachusetts
Emerson House (Haverhill, Massachusetts), listed on the National Register of Historic Places in Essex County, Massachusetts
Emerson House (Methuen, Massachusetts), listed on the National Register of Historic Places in Essex County, Massachusetts
Capt. Oliver Emerson Homestead, Methuen, Massachusetts, listed on the NRHP in Massachusetts
Emerson-Franklin Poole House, Wakefield, Massachusetts, listed on the NRHP in Massachusetts
Emerson Place, Watertown, New York, listed on the NRHP in Jefferson County, New York
Ezekiel Emerson Farm, Rochester, Vermont, listed on the National Register of Historic Places in Windsor County, Vermont
Emerson Hall, Beloit, Wisconsin, listed on the 
National Register of Historic Places listings in Rock County, Wisconsin